Benbow may refer to:

Places
 Benbow, a locality in Woodlands County, Alberta, Canada
 Benbow, California, a community in Humboldt County, California, United States
 Benbow, Missouri, United States
 Benbow Lake, on the South Fork Eel River, California, United States
 Benbow (volcano), a volcano on Ambrym island, Vanuatu

Other uses
 Benbow (surname)
 256797 Benbow, a main belt asteroid
 , three Royal Navy ships
 Benbow Class, later name of the LNWR Alfred the Great Class of railway compound locomotive

See also
 
 Benbo, a Nigerian village - see List of villages in Oyo State